The Saskatchewan Health Authority is the single health region of the province of Saskatchewan. It is a health authority providing direct and contracted health services including primary, secondary, tertiary and quaternary care, home and community care, mental health services, population and preventive health and addictions services to the people of Saskatchewan.
 
It was officially established on December 4, 2017, amalgamating the twelve regional health authorities that previously operated in the province.

Health services provided

Leading up to and during the COVID-19 pandemic, the Saskatchewan Health Authority implemented a vaccine promotion campaign funded by a $650,642 grant from the Public Health Agency of Canada's Immunization Partnership Fund. The program used electronic reminders, in-person engagement and direct marketing to increase uptake of vaccines in general, including mobile clinics to deliver COVID-19 vaccines.

References 

Medical and health organizations based in Saskatchewan
Health regions of Saskatchewan
Government health agencies
Saskatchewan government departments and agencies
2017 establishments in Saskatchewan
Government agencies established in 2017